V-Varen Nagasaki is a Japanese J. League Division 2 football club based in Nagasaki. The club was established in 2005, and gained promotion to the J. League Division 2 in 2012.

Key

 P = Played
 W = Games won
 D = Games drawn
 L = Games lost
 F = Goals for
 A = Goals against
 Pts = Points
 Pos = Final position

 J2L = J. League Division 2
 JFL = Japan Football League
 JRL = Japanese Regional Leagues

 R1 = Round 1
 R2 = Round 2
 R3 = Round 3

Seasons

Seasons
 
V-Varen Nagasaki